James Kinsella may refer to:
 James Kinsella (mayor)
 James Kinsella (entrepreneur)
 Jim Kinsella, Scottish footballer
 Jimmy Kinsella, Irish golfer